The Bernick's Miller Lite Open was an annual bonspiel, or curling tournament, that took place at the Bemidji Curling Club in Bemidji, Minnesota. The tournament was held in a round robin format. The tournament was started in 2012 as part of the World Curling Tour and lasted for four seasons.

Past champions
Only skip's name is displayed.

External links
Bemidji Curling Club website

References

Former World Curling Tour events
Curling in Minnesota
Bemidji, Minnesota
Ontario Curling Tour events